Siege of Damascus may refer to:

 Siege of Damascus (634), a siege during the Muslim conquest of Syria
 The Siege of Damascus, a 1720 play by John Hughes
 Siege of Damascus, a possible siege during the Crusade of 1129
 Siege of Damascus (1148), a siege during the Second Crusade
 Siege of Damascus (1229), a siege during an Ayyubid civil war
 Siege of Damascus (1400), a siege during the conquests of Tamerlane
 Capture of Damascus (1918), a siege during World War I
 Capture of Damascus (1920), a siege during the Franco-Syrian War